Just for Lovers is the second studio album by Sammy Davis Jr., released in 1955.

An album of romantic ballads, Just for Lovers eschews the  comedic impressions of featured on Davis' previous album but ends with Danny Kaye's upbeat song "Happy Ending".

Reception

The Allmusic review by William Ruhlmann awarded the album three and a half stars and said that Davis's performance on the album showed him "as a ballad singer, he revealed the powerful influence of Billy Eckstine." "Davis broke out at the end with a bravura reading of "Happy Ending," here, at least for a couple of minutes, Davis threw in the kind of dynamic elements he so enjoyed showing off in his live performances. Otherwise, this was a surprisingly subdued recording for him"

Track listing
 "You Do Something to Me" (Cole Porter) - 2:18
 "You're My Girl" (Sammy Cahn, Jule Styne) - 3:31
 "Come Rain or Come Shine" (Harold Arlen, Johnny Mercer) - 3:44
 "Body and Soul" (Edward Heyman, Robert Sour, Frank Eyton, Johnny Green) - 3:44
 "It's All Right with Me" (Porter) - 6:06
 "Get Out of Town" (Porter) - 2:47
 "These Foolish Things (Remind Me of You)" (Harry Link, Holt Marvell, Jack Strachey) - 4:06
 "When Your Lover Has Gone" (Einar Aaron Swan) - 3:13
 "The Thrill Is Gone" (Lew Brown, Ray Henderson) - 4:20
 "Tenderly" (Walter Gross, Jack Lawrence) - 3:44
 "Happy Ending" (Sylvia Fine) - 2:37

Personnel
Sammy Davis Jr. - vocals
Sy Oliver - arranger, conductor
Morty Stevens

References

Decca Records albums
Sammy Davis Jr. albums
1955 albums
Albums arranged by Sy Oliver
Albums conducted by Sy Oliver